Chansen station is a railway station located in Chansen Subdistrict, Takhli District, Nakhon Sawan. It is located 173.864 km from Bangkok railway station and is a class 2 railway station. It is on the Northern Line of the State Railway of Thailand. The station opened on 31 October 1905 as part of the Northern Line extension from Lop Buri to Pak Nam Pho.

Train services
 Rapid 105 Bangkok-Sila At
 Rapid 111/112 Bangkok-Den Chai-Bangkok
 Ordinary 201/202 Bangkok-Phitsanulok-Bangkok
 Ordinary 207/208 Bangkok-Nakhon Sawan-Bangkok
 Ordinary 209/210 Bangkok-Ban Takhli-Bangkok
 Ordinary 211/212 Bangkok-Taphan Hin-Bangkok
 Local 401/402 Lop Buri-Phitsanulok-Lop Buri

References 

 
 

Railway stations in Thailand
Railway stations opened in 1905
1905 establishments in Siam